Efficiency New Brunswick (more formally the Energy Efficiency and Conservation Agency of New Brunswick) is a crown corporation in the Canadian province of New Brunswick responsible for energy efficiency grants to New Brunswickers.  The first president and CEO was Elizabeth Weir. In May 2012, Margaret-Ann Blaney resigned her position as Rothesay MLA to assume responsibility as new president and CEO.

Efficiency New Brunswick was merged into the provincial utility company NB Power in 2015.

References

External links 

 Efficiency NB

Crown corporations of New Brunswick